David L. Rose (born February 19, 1967) is a product designer and entrepreneur, and the CEO of Clearwater AR.

Early life 
Rose was born on February 19, 1967, in Chapel Hill, North Carolina when his father, James Rose, was in medical school.

Rose graduated from Madison West High School in Madison, Wisconsin in 1985 and obtained a BA in Physics and Fine Arts from St. Olaf College in 1989. He then went on to earn his master's degree from Harvard University, focusing on technology in education, graduating in 1992.

Career 
Rose founded the company Interactive Factory in 1992, following several years of working as a software engineer in speech recognition and robotics. Interactive Factory, now iFactory, a division of RDW Group, is a boutique design firm specializing in digital and interactive media.

After Interactive Factory's acquisition in 1997, Rose patented the first online photo sharing service and founded Opholio. The start-up was bought by Flashpoint Technology in 1998  and Rose went on to found Viant's Innovation Center, where he was director for four years.

A patent troll company FotoMedia ended up with Rose's online photo sharing patent. Rose criticized the company for "hoarding and non-operating of the technology", using the patent to threaten other companies instead.

In 2002, Rose co-founded Ambient Devices, a spin-off from the MIT Media Lab and a pioneer in embedding Internet information in everyday objects. The Ambient Orb was one of Rose's creations. The company went on to develop over a dozen internet-connected objects including the Ambient Umbrella, the Ambient Dashboard, 5-day Weather Forecaster, and the Energy Joule.

In 2008, Rose founded Vitality, a high-tech healthcare start-up where he conceived and led the development of the GlowCap, the first cellular-connected pill cap. The product was a recipient of the 2010 Medical Design Excellence Awards. Vitality was sold in 2011 to biotech investor Patrick Soon-Shiong and rolled into NantHealth.

Rose is the founder and CEO of Ditto Labs, a Cambridge, Massachusetts-based start-up focused on image-recognition software.

In July 2014, Rose published a book about The Internet of Things, Enchanted Objects: Design, Human Desire, and the Internet of Things. Rose argues that the cell phone monopolizes attention and that there is an opportunity to unglue society from these screens by spreading apps into every day objects like clothing, jewelry, and rooms.

In 2017, Rose was a futurist at IDEO where he worked with a team to design and prototype gesture-based interactions. He also developed computer vision technology for people to perform one and two-handed gestures to control light and sound in the environment. Rose filmed dancers, American Sign Language teachers, mimes, and an orchestra conductor to learn about the communicative power of subtle gestures.

Rose was the VP of Vision Technology at Warby Parker from 2017 to 2019. He has also been a lecturer at the MIT Media Lab, where he worked with the Tangible Media and City Science groups and taught a course called "Enchanted Architecture." 

In 2020, Rose co-founded ClearWater AR, where he serves as CEO. ClearWater AR developed the first augmented reality experience for boaters and fishers with an App Store app that allows them to see water topography, buoys, dropping pins, safe tracks and more, along with a compatible set of glasses and an AR camera coming soon. 

Since 2021, Rose has also served as the Chief Technology Officer for Home Outside which uses aerial and street view data to automatically redesign residential landscapes to improve sustainability, home value, and curb appeal. By simply typing in a home address, Home Outside allows users to visualize and walk through your newly designed yard in 3D. 

Rose is also a Forbes contributor.

Personal life 
Rose lives in Brookline, Massachusetts with his wife and two children.

References

External links 
 Enchanted Objects site
 David Rose profile in Boston Business Journal
 David Rose TEDx Talk
 CEO and founder at Ditto Labs
 Gesture design futurist at IDEO

1967 births
People from Chapel Hill, North Carolina
St. Olaf College alumni
Harvard Graduate School of Education alumni
Living people
MIT Media Lab people
MIT School of Architecture and Planning faculty
American scientists
American technology chief executives
Madison West High School alumni